Gregory Carr may refer to:

Greg Carr (gridiron football) (born 1985), American football player
Greg Carr (rally driver), Australian rally driver
Gregory C. Carr (born 1959), American entrepreneur and philanthropist

See also
 Gregg Carr (born 1962), American football player and surgeon